= Time in Washington =

Time in Washington may refer to:

- Time in Washington (state)
- Time in Washington, D.C.
